The Museo della Zampogna (Bagpipe Museum) is located in Scapoli, Italy.  The museum has a permanent exhibit of a variety of Italian bagpipes as well as bagpipes from other countries.

See also 
 List of music museums

Sources
 Paola Pandiani. I luoghi della musica. Touring Editore, 2003. ,

External links
 Official site

Bagpipe museums
Musical instrument museums in Italy
Zampoga
Museums in Molise
Buildings and structures in the Province of Isernia